Niedersachsenstadion is a football stadium in Hanover, Lower Saxony, Germany, which is home to  football club Hannover 96.

The original 86,000-capacity stadium was completed in 1954 and has since been rebuilt several times for various major football events. Today it has 49,000 covered seats. During the 2006 FIFA World Cup the stadium was named FIFA World Cup Stadium, Hanover.

Through a sponsorship deal, the stadium's official name is currently Heinz-von-Heiden-Arena . Between 2002 and 2013 a similar arrangement saw the stadium renamed as the  AWD-Arena ; from 2013 to 2022 the stadium was named HDI-Arena .

History
The stadium was built from 1952 to 1954, with an original capacity of 86,000. Huge amounts of debris from the houses in Hanover destroyed during World War II were used as the foundations of the stadium, with a total construction cost of 4 million Deutschmark. The stadium officially opened on 26 September 1954.

Hannover 96 moved permanently to the stadium from the Eilenriedestadion in 1959. Other local clubs, such as Arminia Hannover, OSV Hannover, TSV Havelse and Sportfreunde Ricklingen have also played matches there. In addition, the stadium has hosted numerous international matches, 4 (old) league championship games (in 1955, 1957, 1958 and 1961), 2 DFB-Supercup finals (in 1991 and 1992) and 8 DFB-Pokal finals (in 1962, 1963, 1965, 1970, 1972, 1975, 1977 and 1979).

From 2002 to 2013 the stadium carried the name of financial service provider AWD. From 2013 to 2022 it was named after insurance company HDI. Since 2022, the naming rights are held by construction company .

On 17 November 2015, the stadium was due to host an international friendly between Germany and the Netherlands. However, the match was postponed two hours before kick off following reports of a "concrete security threat" and "intention to ignite explosives". The stadium and surrounding areas were evacuated, though no explosives were found.

TSV Havelse played in the stadium in the 2021–22 3. Liga since their regular home stadium, the Wilhelm-Langrehr-Stadion in Garbsen, did not meet 3. Liga requirements. Similarly, VfB Oldenburg will initially play their evening and winter home matches in the 2022–23 3. Liga at the stadium since their home stadium, the Marschweg-Stadion in Oldenburg, currently lacks floodlights and a heated pitch and is bound to noise regulation ordinances for matches after 18:30. The club aims to fix these problems and move back to Oldenburg as soon as possible.

International football tournaments

All times local (CEST)

1974 FIFA World Cup 

The stadium was one of the nine venues chosen for (West) Germany's first hosting of the World Cup. This event saw the number of seats increase to 38,000, which entailed a decrease in the overall capacity to 60,400. In addition, the upper rank of the west grandstand was completely roofed. These alterations cost 26million DM. Newly modified, the arena featured in both the first and second group phase.

The following games were played at the stadium during the World Cup of 1974:

1988 European Championship 

When Germany hosted its second international tournament, the stadium was again chosen as a venue. By now, due to the conversion of 8,000 terrace spots into single seating, the capacity stood at 55,000. It hosted two group matches:

2006 FIFA World Cup 
The stadium was one of the venues for the 2006 FIFA World Cup. However, due to FIFA sponsorship contracts, the arena had to officially be called FIFA World Cup Stadium Hanover during the World Cup. The stadium also had to convert its standing areas into seating, thus reducing the capacity for the tournament to 43,000, before being converted back after the games.

The following games were played at the stadium during the World Cup of 2006:

Modern redevelopment 

Although the stadium has seen many changes through the years, none were as extensive and impacting  as the redevelopment of 2003/04 by Schulitz & Partner Architects, which cost €65 million.

There had been much controversy within the club's fanbase over suggestions of building a new football arena for many years before. Eventually this led to the decision to preserve and comprehensively redevelop the existing stadium in 1997/98. When Germany was somewhat unexpectedly awarded the hosting of the 2006 FIFA World Cup, the major stadium work was finally put into action.

During 2003/04, major parts of the stadium were rebuilt and thus the maximum capacity was reduced to 49,951 (of which around 8,000 are standing spaces). Before 2003, the stadium had had high floodlight masts (referred to by locals as 'toothbrushes'), track and field facilities inclusive and about 60% was open plan. The redevelopments transformed it completely into a football arena and removed approximately 70% of the previous building. The roof and about 25% of the area at the outer edges of the west grandstand were demolished like the north, south and east grandstand.

Instead of the previous scoreboards, the arena gained two modern video boards and replaced the old floodlight masts with 160 modern single headlights, which were integrated into the roof structure, supplying a light density of 1500 lux.

The pitch, under which a high performance drainage system and a cabin ground heating system was installed, was moved closer to the spectators than ever. With the removal of the track and field facilities, the pitch was moved directly to the west grandstand and the remaining grandstands were then built around it. This necessitated the stands behind the goals be designed in such a way that the upward gradient becomes larger gradually from west to east, creating a rather peculiar asymmetry, as the original west grandstand possessed such small angles of inclination and the new east grandstand was as constructed as steeply as possible.

The new inner roof was constructed using ETFE (ethylene tetrafluoroethylene) to allow sunlight through and thus allow the grass the grow naturally, whilst also protecting all spectators from bad weather . This care for the pitch helps avoid the constant need to re-lay it as in many other roofed stadiums and was designed by Hanke Loköter who helped construction the Allianz Arena as well.

The new business and corporate packages of the AWD-Arena are just like the press area in the east grandstand. There are approximately 1,250 business seats, 29 VIP boxes for 10–12 people and 96 press places.

Work on the stadium finished ahead of schedule in December 2004. The first football match held following the redevelopment was on 23 January 2005, where Hannover 96 lost 3–0 to Bayer Leverkusen in the Bundesliga.

In June 2008, it hosted the 2008 Hannover Sevens, the European Sevens championship in rugby union.

On 15 November 2009, the stadium was filled to capacity as the funeral site for 32-year-old Hannover 96 goalkeeper Robert Enke, who killed himself on 10 November 2009.

The stadium is one of few actual stadiums to be named on FIFA 12 when it was released of 28 September 2011.

Other uses 

Aside from football, the stadium was also the scene of several German athletics championships, the German Turnfest (a sports festival), field handball finals, concerts, rugby & American football.

Since the performances of The Rolling Stones in 1982, the stadium has developed into the leading open-air concert venue in Northern Germany. After the stadium underwent extensive redevelopment in 2003/04, the open air tradition was revived again with a concert by The Rolling Stones in the new arena. Madonna performed at the stadium during her Confessions Tour in August 2006 for an audience of 40,000. Other performers who held a concert at the venue include Michael Jackson in 1988 as part of his Bad World Tour, Bon Jovi in 1996 for his These Days Tour, Status Quo in 2006 and U2 in 2010 during their U2 360° Tour with total 56,494 audience and Kasabian as Support Act.

In 2013, Bruce Springsteen and the E Street Band as well as Robbie Williams are set to give concerts for the first time at the stadium.

Artists with more than two concerts at the venue:

References

External links

 Official website
 Fan photos from the old Niedersachsenstadion

2006 FIFA World Cup stadiums
1974 FIFA World Cup stadiums
2005 FIFA Confederations Cup stadiums
UEFA Euro 1988 stadiums
Football venues in Germany
Rugby union stadiums in Germany
Buildings and structures in Hanover
Hannover 96
Rugby union in Hanover
Sports venues in Lower Saxony
1954 establishments in Germany
Sports venues completed in 1954